NK Oriolik is a Croatian professional football club based in Oriovac. They currently compete in 4. HNL (fourth level). The club's greatest successes were five appearances in the Croatian Cup (in 2002, 2005, 2006, 2007 and 2008) and their best result was reaching the second round in the 2008–09 edition.

External links
NK Oriolik at Nogometni magazin 

Football clubs in Croatia
Association football clubs established in 1923
1923 establishments in Croatia